Charles Picqué (born 1 November 1948) is a Belgian politician. He is a former Minister-President of the Brussels Capital-Region.

After obtaining a master's degree in economics at the Institut d'administration et de gestion at the Louvain School of Management (University of Louvain), he made his first steps in politics in the Brussels municipality of Saint-Gilles, where he has been mayor since 1985.

Deeply concerned by urban issues in general and Brussels urban issues in particular, he has devoted a large part of his political activity to promoting and defending Brussels' role and rights as a full region – at par with the two other regions of Belgium – within the institutional framework of the Belgian state.

When the government of the Brussels-Capital Region was established in 1989, he became his first Minister-President with two mandates that lasted until 1999. In July 2004, he was reappointed to the same position.

In 1999, he was appointed Special Rapporteur for the Federal Government on Policies in support of Major Cities. During his mandate as Minister of the Economy and Scientific Research – from 2000 to 2003 – he maintained this responsibility, and played a key role in introducing measures to support Belgium's large cities in coping with the specific problems typical of major urban agglomerations.

During his leadership of the Brussels-Capital Region, he has pushed strongly for urban regeneration and social cohesiveness, with a strong emphasis on the areas of the Brussels Region which face the most serious problems.

In 2007, he launched another important project, an International Development Plan for Brussels, or IDP. The initiative involves the complete renewal of ten major sites within the city, and aims to strengthen the role of Brussels as the capital of Europe and as a major European city with a strong international vocation.

In the current negotiations on institutional reform, his main priority is to defend Brussels' status as a full region, to emphasize the fundamental importance of the Brussels economy for Belgium and for the other two regions, and to promote its natural role – as Belgium's only bilingual Region – in improving ties and cohesion between the country's French and Dutch-speaking communities.

Picqué stepped down as Minister-President of the Brussels-Capital Region on 7 May 2013, and was replaced by Rudi Vervoort.

Political career
 1983–1985: Member of the Saint-Gilles municipal Council, with responsibility for Town Planning
 1985–: Mayor of Saint-Gilles
 1985–1987: Member of the Provincial Council of Brabant
 1988–1990: Member of Parliament, Chambre des députés
 1988–89: Minister of the French-speaking Community, with responsibility for Social Affairs and Health
 1989–95: Minister-President of the Brussels-Capital Region, with responsibility for Town Planning, Local Authorities, Employment and Urban Regeneration
 1995–1999: Minister-President of the Brussels-Capital Region, with responsibility for Local Authorities, Employment, Monuments and Protected Buildings
 1995–1999: Minister of the French-speaking Community, with responsibility for Cultural Affairs
 1999–2000: Member of Parliament, Chambre des députés
 1999–2000: Special Rapporteur for the Federal Government on Policies in support of Major Cities
 2000–2003: Minister of the Economy and Scientific Research of the Federal Government, with responsibility for Policies in support of Major Cities
 May 2003: Member of Parliament, Chambre des députés
 July 2004-May 2013 : Minister-President of the Brussels-Capital Region, with responsibility for Urban Planning, Local Authorities, Monuments and Protected Buildings, Urban Regeneration, Housing, Refuse Disposal and Resource Recovery, and Foreign Trade

References

External links

 
 Brussels-Capital Region's official website
 Brussels Studies

|-

|-

1948 births
Belgian Ministers of State
Ministers-President of the Brussels-Capital Region
Living people
Socialist Party (Belgium) politicians
People from Etterbeek
21st-century Belgian politicians
Mayors of places in Belgium